was a railway station in the city of Yokote, Akita Prefecture,  Japan, operated by JR East. The station closed permanently on March 12, 2022.

Lines

During the winter months (December - March), the station is closed.

Station layout
The station consists of a single side platform serving bi-directional traffic. There is a waiting room at the center of the platform. The station is unattended.

History
Yabitsu Station opened on July 15, 1963, as a station on the Japan National Railways (JNR). The station was absorbed into the JR East network upon the privatization of the JNR on April 1, 1987.

In December 2016, it was announced that the station would be closed during the winter months (January - March).

The station closed permanently on March 12, 2022.

Surrounding area

See also
List of railway stations in Japan

References

External links

 JR East Station information 

Railway stations in Japan opened in 1963
Railway stations in Akita Prefecture
Railway stations closed in 2022
Kitakami Line
Yokote, Akita